This is an alphabetical index of articles related to the Renaissance.

0-9 
1400s in art =
1500 in art

A 
Académie de musique et de poésie -
Accademia degli Infiammati -
Accademia Filarmonica di Verona -
Accademia Fiorentina -
Age of Discovery -
Air de cour -
Aldine Press -
Allegory in Renaissance literature -
Allemande -
Almain rivet -
Andalusian cadence -
Antwerp Mannerism -
Antwerp school -
Arquebus -
Ars historica -
Art patronage of Julius II -
Artists of the Tudor court

B 
Ballo -
Baluster -
Bardini Gardens -
Basse danse -
Bastion fort -
Bicinium -
Bolognese School -
Bolognese Swordsmanship -
Bonfire of the vanities -
Brancacci Chapel -
Branchwork -
Brick Renaissance -
Broken consort -
Brussels tapestry -
Burgonet -
Burgundian School

C 
Camera degli Sposi -
Canary dance -
Cangiante -
Cantore al liuto -
Capriccio (art) -
Carmen figuratum -
Carnival song -
Carracks black sword -
Catherine de' Medici's building projects -
Catherine de' Medici's court festivals -
Catherine de' Medici's patronage of the arts -
Centrifugal pump -
Certosina -
Chamber of rhetoric -
Chariot clock -
Châteaux of the Loire Valley -
Chiaroscuro -
Chinese porcelain in European painting -
Christian Humanism -
Cinquecento -
Cinquedea -
The Civilization of the Renaissance in Italy -
Classical republicanism -
Colascione -
Commesso -
Consort of instruments -
Consort song -
Continuity thesis -
Copernican heliocentrism -
Copernican Revolution -
Cordial (medicine) -
Cornamuse -
Corseque -
Cortile del Belvedere -
Courante -
Court painter -
Cresset -
Cross-strung harp -
Crumhorn -
Cultural references to Leonardo da Vinci -
Culverin -
Cutwork -
Cyclic mass -
Czech Renaissance architecture

D 
Dancing mania -
Danube school -
Dardanelles Gun -
David (Donatello) -
De pictura -
De re aedificatoria -
Demi-culverin -
Desco da parto -
Diamond vault -
Donor portrait -
Drawing room -
Dutch and Flemish Renaissance painting -
Dutch gable -
Dutch Renaissance and Golden Age literature

E 
Early Netherlandish painting -
Elizabethan and Jacobean furniture -
Elizabethan architecture -
Elizabethan era -
Elizabethan leisure -
Elizabethan literature -
English Madrigal School -
English Renaissance -
English Renaissance theatre -
Estoc -
Europa regina -
European colonization of the Americas -
Evolutionary ideas of the Renaissance and Enlightenment

F 
Fall of Constantinople -
Figura serpentinata -
Flame-bladed sword -
Flemish painting -
Florence -
Florentine Camerata -
Florentine citron -
Florentine painting -
Florin -
Folly (allegory) -
Forlivese school of art -
Franco-Flemish School -
French Renaissance -
French Renaissance architecture -
French Renaissance literature -
Fresco -
Frottola

G 
Gallery of Sistine Chapel ceiling -
Galliard -
Gardens of the French Renaissance -
Gavotte -
Geohumoral theory -
German Renaissance -
Ghent-Bruges school -
Ghisi Shield -
Giant order -
Gnome -
Gobelins Manufactory -
Gothic boxwood miniature -
Grand manner -
Grands rhétoriqueurs -
Greek scholars in the Renaissance -
Greenwich armour -
Guldengroschen

H 
Halberd -
Hand cannon -
Harpsichord -
Harpsichord-viola -
Hedge maze -
Henry II style -
Herrerian style -
High Renaissance -
Hispano-Flemish style -
Hispano-Moresque ware -
History of Italian Renaissance domes -
History of science in the Renaissance -
Holbein carpet -
Hours of James IV of Scotland -
Hours of Lorenzo de' Medici -
House of Borgia -
House of Medici -
House of Sforza -
Humanism in France -
The Hunt of the Unicorn

I 
I quattro libri dell'architettura -
Ideal city -
Ideal town -
Illusionism (art) -
Illusionistic ceiling painting -
Imprimatura -
Incunable -
Intercolumniation -
Intermedio -
Isenheim Altarpiece -
Italian city-states -
Italian Renaissance -
Italian Renaissance garden -
Italian Renaissance interior design -
Italian Renaissance painting -
Italian Wars

J 
Jacobean architecture -
Jewel of Vicenza -
Jig -
Jousting

K 
Katzbalger -
Kepler's laws of planetary motion -
Knot garden -
Koncerz

L 
Landsknecht -
Lantern shield -
The Last Judgment -
The Last Supper -
Laurentian Library -
Legal humanists -
Leonardeschi -
Leonardo da Vinci -
Leonardo's robot -
Libro de' Disegni -
Limoges enamel -
Lira da braccio -
Little Masters -
Lives of the Most Excellent Painters, Sculptors, and Architects -
Lochaber axe -
Lombard (gun) -
Long gallery -
Longsword -
Lotto carpet -
Lublin Renaissance -
Lucan portrait of Leonardo da Vinci
Lucerne hammer -
Lute song

M 
Madia (furniture) -
Madrigal -
Madrigal comedy -
Madrigale spirituale -
Maiolica -
Mannerism -
Mannerist architecture and sculpture in Poland -
Mariner's astrolabe - 
Mascherata -
Maximilian armour -
Medical Renaissance -
Mensural notation -
Messer (weapon) -
Michelangelo -
Michelangelo and the Medici -
Millefleur -
Monster of Ravenna -
Moresca -
Moresche -
Moresque -
Motet -
Motet-chanson -
Museo Nazionale Scienza e Tecnologia Leonardo da Vinci -
Music in the Elizabethan era -
Musica reservata -
Musique mesurée -
Musket

N 
Natural magic -
Neostoicism -
New Learning -
Northern Mannerism -
Northern Renaissance

O 
Oil painting -
Oriental carpets in Renaissance painting -
Ostrich Egg Globe -
Overdoor -
Ovetari Chapel

P 
Palazzo Chiericati -
Palladian architecture -
Palladian villas of the Veneto -
Palmanova -
Paragone -
Paraphrase mass -
Paris in the 16th century -
Parody mass -
Pastel -
Pastiglia -
Pastrana Tapestries -
Pavane -
Pazzi conspiracy -
Period eye -
Personal life of Leonardo da Vinci -
Perspective -
Petrarchan sonnet -
Piano nobile -
Picaresque novel -
Pietra dura -
Pietra serena -
Pike (weapon) -
Pinxit -
Piva (dance) -
Plackart -
Plaquette -
Plate armour -
Plateresque -
Platonic Academy (Florence) -
Platonism in the Renaissance -
Pléiade -
Poignard -
Polymath -
Polyphony -
Polyptych -
Ponte Vecchio, Bassano -
Portrait painting in Scotland -
Portuguese Renaissance -
Prestezza -
Primavera (Botticelli) -
Printing press -
Prodigy house -
Pseudo-Kufic -
Purism (Spanish architecture) -
Putto

Q 
Quattrocento -

R 
Rackett -
Raphael -
Raphael Cartoons -
Raphael Rooms -
Rebec -
Recitative -
Reichsthaler -
Rapier -
Relazione -
Renaissance -
Renaissance architecture -
Renaissance architecture in Central and Eastern Europe -
Renaissance architecture in Portugal -
Renaissance architecture of Toulouse -
Renaissance art -
Renaissance castle in Galanta -
Renaissance dance -
Renaissance humanism -
Renaissance humanism in Northern Europe -
Renaissance in Croatia -
Renaissance in Poland -
Renaissance in Scotland -
Renaissance in the Low Countries -
Renaissance Latin -
Renaissance literature -
Renaissance magic -
Renaissance music -
Renaissance Papacy -
Renaissance philosophy -
Renaissance reenactment -
Renaissance Revival architecture -
Renaissance Studies -
Renaissance technology -
Ribauldequin -
Ricercar -
Road of Weser Renaissance -
Rodeleros -
Roman Renaissance -
Roman School -
Romanism (painting) -
Rondel dagger -
Roof lantern -
Rustication (architecture)

S 
Sackbut -
Sacra conversazione -
Saint-Porchaire ware -
Sala dei Cento Giorni -
Saltarello -
San Giorgio Maggiore (church), Venice -
Sassetti Chapel -
Schlüsselfelder Ship -
The School of Athens -
School of Ferrara -
School of Fontainebleau -
The School of Night -
Science and inventions of Leonardo da Vinci -
Scientific Revolution -
Scottish Renaissance painted ceilings -
Scottish Royal tapestry collection - Sculpture in the Renaissance Period -
Scythe sword -
Sforza Hours -
Sforzinda -
Sfumato -
Sgabello -
Sgraffito -
William Shakespeare -
Shakespearean comedy -
Shakespearean dance -
Shakespearean history -
Shakespeare's plays -
Shakespearean tragedy -
Sienese School -
Signoria -
Signoria of Florence -
Signoria of Venice -
Sinopia -
Sistine Chapel -
Sistine Chapel ceiling -
Snaplock -
Soggetto cavato -
Souterliedekens -
Spada da lato -
Spalliera -
Spanish Golden Age -
Spanish Renaissance -
Spanish Renaissance architecture -
Spanish Renaissance literature -
St. Peter's Basilica -
Stiletto -
Stipo a bambocci -
Strapwork -
Strolling players -
Studiolo of the Palazzo Belfiore -
Summa de arithmetica -
Swedish Reformation and Renaissance literature -
Swiss dagger -
Swiss degen -
Swiss Guard -
Swiss mercenaries

T 
Tapestry -
Tarot -
Teatro Olimpico -
Tercio -
Text declamation -
Theatrum Orbis Terrarum -
Themes in Italian Renaissance painting -
Tiento -
Tondo (art) -
Tornabuoni Chapel -
Tourdion -
Transition from Renaissance to Baroque in instrumental music -
Trattato della pittura -
Trecento -
The Triumph of Fame -
Tudor architecture - 
Tudor period -
Tuileries Garden -
Tuileries Palace -
Tuscan order

U 
Underdrawing -
Underpainting -
Unione

V 
Valois Tapestries -
Vatican loggias -
Venetian painting -
Venetian Patent Statute -
Venetian polychoral style -
Venetian red -
Venetian Renaissance -
Venetian Renaissance architecture -
Venetian School (music) -
Venetian window -
Vihuela -
Villa Capra "La Rotonda" -
Villa Cornaro -
Villa d'Este -
Villancico -
Villanella -
Viol -
Viola organista -
Virelai -
Virginals -
Vitruvian Man -
Volta (dance)

W 
Waddesdon Bequest -
Wars of the Roses -
Wernigerode Armorial -
Weser Renaissance -
Wet-on-wet -
William Shakespeare -
Word painting

X

Y

Z 
Zweihänder

Lists 
Commentators on Aristotle -
Composers -
English Renaissance composers -
English Renaissance theatres -
Figures -
Humanists -
Structures -
Works by Leonardo da Vinci

See also 
 Medieval renaissances
 Outline of the Renaissance

Articles
Renaissance topics